Kaalam Maari Kadha Maari is a 1987 Malayalam film. It was directed by M. Krishnan Nair, written by Devan V. and starring Mammootty, Shobhana, Adoor Bhasi, and Lalu Alex. The film was produced by T. E. Vasudevan. It was the last film of both the director and the producer.

Plot 
Ummu Kholzu (Shobhana) is married to Kamarudeen (Mammootty), whose hands are paralyzed. Ummu, hailing from a poor background had to marry him against her wishes. He descends from a rich, aristocrat family. She was in love with Razzak (Lalu Alex), her neighbor, but her father (Thilakan) objected to their relationship and made her marry Kamarudeen. After the marriage, she suffered mental torture and insults from her father in law and sister in law. Fed up after seeing her sufferings, Kamarudeen leaves his house along with her. At her house, Kamar discovers Ummu's past affair with Razak and becomes suspicious.

Razak's wife dies of an accident. Kamar realizes his mistake and decides to save Ummu's life as he believes that Razzak is more suitable for her. Kamar gives her talaq and moves back to his house. There his father asks him to take back Ummu. Razzak and Ummu get engaged. Ummu was not ready to accept Razzak this time as for her Kamar is her husband. On the day of marriage she flees and commits suicide. Kamar sees her jumping from a cliff to the waterfalls and also slips and falls inside while saving her.

Cast 

 Mammootty as Kamarudden
 Shobhana as Ummu Kolzu
 Adoor Bhasi as Mustafa
 Sudha Chandran as Arifa
 Mukesh as Yusaf
 Lalu Alex as Razzak
 Mala Aravindan as Koya
 Mamukkoya as Pareed
 Sukumari as Alimma
 Ragini (New) as Tahira
 Thilakan as Hameed
 T. P. Madhavan as Mammali
 Balan K. Nair as Aliyarukunji
 Santhakumari 
 Valsala Menon as Kamarudheen's mother
Sankaradi as Sulaiman

References

External links
 

1980s Malayalam-language films
1987 films
Films directed by M. Krishnan Nair